Nowabad (also Romanized as Nowābād) is a village in Pain Khiyaban-e Litkuh Rural District, in the Central District of Amol County, Mazandaran Province, Iran. At the 2006 census, its population was 298, in 80 families.

References 

Populated places in Amol County